Team Taisan (チーム・タイサン, stylized as Team TAISAN) is a Japanese auto racing team founded in 1983 by Yasutsune "Ricky" Chiba and owned by the Taisan Industrial Company. Most active in the Super GT Series, formerly known as the All Japan Grand Touring Car Championship (JGTC), Taisan has been involved in all but one season from 1994 to 2018, taking a sabbatical in 2015. During that time they have won eight team championships and four drivers championships, representing manufacturers Ferrari, Porsche, Dodge, Toyota, Nissan, and Audi. For nearly their entire career, Taisan has been sponsored by tire manufacturer Yokohama Rubber Company, often carrying the name of Yokohama's Advan brand.

History

The team was initially formed through  and their efforts in the All Japan Endurance Championship and Fuji Long Distance Series.  Taisan operated one of the teams' Porsche 962C with drivers Kunimitsu Takahashi and Kenji Takahashi.  Kunimitsu went on to win the Endurance Championship three times from 1985 to 1987, while Nova Engineering won the team championships in the Fuji Long Distance Series those same years. Taisan expanded their program to include the Japanese Touring Car Championship in 1989 with BMW M3s, adding Briton Will Hoy to the team in 1990.  A Group A category Nissan Skyline GT-R was added to the team in 1991 for Kenji Takahashi and Keiichi Tsuchiya while their BMWs continued in the lower JTC-2 category.  Kunimitsu replaced Kenji in the Skyline for 1992 and 1993 before Kunimitsu and Tsuchiya left to form their own racing team and the JTCC eliminated the Group A cars from the series, leaving the team with a single Super Touring BMW for Kazuo Mogi in 1994.

Taisan returned to sports car racing in 1994 in the new All Japan Grand Touring Car Championship, the team participating with one of their former 962Cs and teamed alongside a Ferrari F40.  Masahiko Kondo and Anthony Reid won one race for the Porsche while Tetsuya Ota and Oscar Larrauri earned one victory in the Ferrari.  A switch to a pair of Porsche 911 GT2s earned three GT1 victories in 1995 and the teams championship for the GT1 category, while the team also added a GT2 class campaign under the Team Taisan Jr. moniker for a Porsche 964.  Taisan Jr. became a dominant team in the rechristened GT300 class, winning the drivers and teams championships in 1996, followed by second place in 1997 and another championship in 1998 while campaigning a new Toyota MR2 in cooperation with Tsuchiya Engineering.

Their Porsche 911 GT3-R, driven by Hideo Fukuyama, Atsushi Yogo, and Bruno Lambert won the category by a six-lap margin. Upon returning to Japan, Taisan began a streak of four consecutive GT300 team championships from 2000–2003, including a drivers championship with Fukuyama in 2000. Taisan downsized to a single Porsche team from 2004 onward as the JGTC transitioned to the new Super GT Series; Taisan eventually joined with Endless for a joint program that earned them another drivers and teams championships in 2012. The team expanded once again in 2013, retaining the Porsche in Super GT while joining the new Asian Le Mans Series with a Ferrari 458 Italia GT2, winning the series championship and earning the team an automatic invitation to Le Mans, their first since . A difficult 2014 season with a new Nissan GT-R led Taisan to take a sabbatical year from Super GT, returning in 2016 with an Audi R8 LMS in cooperation with SARD.

Team Taisan also began to embrace electric motorsport by participating in the All Japan EV-GP Series in 2011 with Tesla Roadsters as well as a modified Porsche 914, winning the 2011 championship.  The team also began developing electric karts.  In 2018 Chiba announced an auction of many former Taisan racing cars dating back to the early 1990s, including several JGTC and Super GT machines.  Chiba also announced at the conclusion of the 2018 Super GT season that the team would cease participation in Super GT, instead concentrating solely on electric motorsports.

References

Japanese auto racing teams
1983 establishments in Japan
Auto racing teams established in 1983
24 Hours of Le Mans teams
Super GT teams